Jacques Barrot (3 February 1937 – 3 December 2014) was a French politician, who served as European Commissioner for Justice between 2008 and 2010, after having spent four years serving as Commissioner for Transport (2004–2008) and Commissioner for Regional Policy for eight months (2004). He was also one of five vice-presidents of the 27-member Barroso Commission. He previously held various ministerial positions in France, and was a member of the right-wing political party UMP. He was officially approved in his post by the European Parliament on 18 June 2008 with a vote of 489 to 52 with 19 abstentions.

Barrot was a European Commissioner between April 2004 and, serving as Commissioner for Regional Policy in the Prodi Commission before being selected as a Vice-President and Commissioner for Transport in the Barroso Commission.

He was convicted in a French court of embezzlement in 2000. The case involved the diverting of £2 million of government money to his party. He received an eight-month suspended prison sentence. His conviction was automatically erased by a 1995 presidential amnesty.

Barrot was approved by the European Parliament in 2004 for Commissioner of Transport and made a Vice-President in the new Barroso Commission. However shortly after he began work, his previous conviction was revealed by Nigel Farage, MEP for Independence and Democracy. French President Jacques Chirac had granted him presidential amnesty, a fact the Commissioner did not disclose during his hearing to the Parliament. Despite calls from some MEPs for him to be suspended he remained in office after a large majority accepted legal opinion that Barrot was not legally required to disclose the amnesty.

A major project during his term was the Galileo positioning system. Work on the system began a year before Barrot came to office and has developed since with the launch of the first satellite. However infighting within private sector partners may have been a potential setback to the project with Barrot favouring greater funds from the EU budget. Other work includes recent guarantees of air passenger rights and the Single European Sky.

Barrot died on 3 December 2014 in Neuilly-sur-Seine at the age of 77.

Political career

Member of the Constitutional Council of France : Since 2010.
Vice-President of the European Commission : November 2004 – 2010.
European Commissioner for Justice and Home Affairs : 2008–2010.
European Commissioner for Transports : 2004–2008.
European Commissioner for Regional Policy : March–November 2004.

Governmental functions

Secretary of State for Housing : 1974–1978.
Minister of Trade and Handicrafts : 1978–1979.
Minister of Health and Social Security : 1979–1981.
Minister of Labor, Social Dialogue and Participation : May–November 1995.
Minister of Labor and Social Affairs : 1995–1997.

Electoral mandates

National Assembly of France

President of the group of Union for a Popular Movement : 2002–2004 (Resignation).
Member of the National Assembly of France for Haute-Loire's 1st constituency : 1967–1974 (Became Secretary of State in 1974) / 1981–1995 (Became minister in 1995) / 1997–2004 (Resignation, became member of the European Commission in 2004). Elected in 1967, re-elected in 1968, 1973, 1978, 1981, 1986, 1988, 1993, 1997, 2002.

General Council

President of the Haute-Loire General Council : 1976–2001. Re-elected in 1979, 1982, 1985, 1988, 1992, 1994, 1998.
General councillor of Haute-Loire : 1966–2008. Re-elected in 1970, 1976, 1982, 1988, 1994, 2001.

Municipal Council

Mayor of Yssingeaux : 1989–2001. Re-elected in 1995.
Deputy-mayor of Yssingeaux : 1971–1989. Re-elected in 1977, 1983.
Municipal councillor of Yssingeaux : 1965–2001. Re-elected in 1971, 1977, 1983, 1989, 1995.

References

External links
Official website

|-

|-

|-

|-

|-

1937 births
2014 deaths
Centre Democracy and Progress politicians
Centre of Social Democrats politicians
20th-century French criminals
French European Commissioners
French Ministers of Commerce and Industry
French Ministers of Health
French politicians convicted of crimes
Politicians convicted of embezzlement
People from Haute-Loire
Politicians from Auvergne-Rhône-Alpes
Recipients of French presidential pardons
Transport and the European Union
Union for a Popular Movement politicians
Union for French Democracy politicians
Officiers of the Légion d'honneur
Sciences Po alumni
Deputies of the 12th National Assembly of the French Fifth Republic